"Fortuosity" is the first song in the 1967 motion picture The Happiest Millionaire which was written by the Sherman Brothers and performed by Tommy Steele playing the part of "John Lawless" (the butler). Richard Sherman stated that the word meant "Faith and Good Fortune". Apparently derived from "fortuitous", which refers to something that happens by fortune or chance, "fortuosity" is a Disney neologism and has a more positive meaning than "fortuitous" or that word's standard noun form, "fortuity", which means accident, chance, or an accidental occurrence. Steele also sings the song "I'll Always Be Irish" in the movie.

Other versions
"Fortuosity" has been covered by other performers.
The Mills Brothers' 1968 album Fortuosity had it as the title track. This album also contained their top adult contemporary hit, "Cab Driver".
Carol Burnett recorded a version with RCA Victor.
Count Basie recorded a version with London.
Vic Damone recorded a version with RCA Victor.
Nancy Sinatra performed the song with the nine foot tall Muppet named "Thog" in her Las Vegas stage show.

Disneyland
The New Century Timepieces store on Disneyland's Main Street was named the Fortuosity Shop in October 2008.

References

1967 songs
1967 singles
Tommy Steele songs
Songs written by the Sherman Brothers